Baltinglass, historically known as Baltinglas, is a town in south-west County Wicklow, Ireland. It is located on the River Slaney near the border with County Carlow and County Kildare, on the N81 road.

Etymology
The town's Irish name, Bealach Conglais means "the way of Conglas". It was the name of a palace at Baltinglass, where, according to the Irish etymologist Patrick Weston Joyce, the powerful Leinster king Branduff resided in the sixth century. Conglas was a member of the mythological warrior collective, the Fianna.

A nineteenth-century explanation is found in Samuel Lewis' A Topographical Dictionary of Ireland, where he says that the name, "according to most antiquaries," comes from Baal-Tin-Glas, meaning the "pure fire of Baal," and that this suggests that the area was a centre for "druidical worship".

The detailed study, The Place-names of County Wicklow by Liam Price provides several variations of the town name from the 12th century Book of Leinster, through King King Henry VIII's state papers, to the 17th century Down Survey.

Previous Irish-language names for the village bring to mind its monastic past. These, as mentioned in two 17th-century works, are Mainistear an Bhealaigh and Mainister an Beala. The first of these, Mainistir an Bhealaigh, has been the name used since the beginning of the independent Irish state.

History
The surrounding hills of the area are rich in archaeological and historical sites, including the Rathcoran passage structure. To the north end of the village on the weir of the River Slaney lies the ruins of an ancient monastery, Baltinglass Abbey, that has had many additions over the centuries; the original church is said to date from around 700 A.D.

The medieval Viscounts Baltinglass were from the Hiberno-Norman Eustace family, who also founded Ballymore Eustace. Their estates later passed to their cousin Sir Maurice Eustace, Lord Chancellor of Ireland 1660-1665. Sir Maurice did much to promote the development of the town, building a church, a school and a bridge, and encouraging new settlers.

The town gained national attention in 1950 when the replacement of a local postal worker, Helen Cooke, led to accusations of political cronyism nationally and a local row which became known as the 'Battle of Baltinglass'.

The town centre mainly lies east of the river, along Main Street and ends at Market and Weavers Square. West of the river, the town is located around the N81/R747 crossroads, along Edward Street, Mill Street and Belan Street. Quinn's superstore is a landmark site on Mill Street to the North of the town.  

Baltinglass has a number of natural, archaeological and built heritage sites; such as Baltinglass Hills, Baltinglass Abbey and St. Mary's Church, the River Slaney Special Area of conservation and a number of buildings of architectural and historical merit, several of which are located in the town centre.

In the 20 years between the 1996 and 2016 census, the population of the town almost doubled from 1,127 to 2,137 people.

Culture

Baltinglass has featured in film and theatre, being the location for the 1974 movie of Brian Friel's play Philadelphia, Here I Come! starring Donal McCann and Siobhán McKenna. It was also the location of the workhouse in Sebastian Barry's play The Steward of Christendom.

Sport
The local Gaelic Athletic Association club, Baltinglass GAA, has several pitches and teams. One of their early successes was the 1912 Junior title. In 1927 they won the Wicklow Senior Hurling title. 1958 saw Baltinglass win the Wicklow Senior Football Championship for the first time and, in 2020, they won their 23rd such title. In 1990 the club claimed the All-Ireland Senior Club Football Championship.

Transport

Rail
Baltinglass railway station opened on 1 September 1885, as part of the line from Sallins to Tullow. It closed to passengers on 27 January 1947 and to goods traffic on 10 March 1947, and closed altogether on 1 April 1959 along with the rest of the line. The site is now mainly occupied by a livestock mart, although the station building remains intact.

Bus
Bus services are available to Carlow via Rathvilly and Tullow, twice daily Mondays to Fridays. This route is operated by JJ Kavanagh and Sons, and it stops in Baltinglass outside Burkes shop, to pick up/drop off passengers. Bus Éireann route 132 provides a once-a-day, each-way commuter link to Dublin via Tallaght on the same days. There is also a limited range of Bus Éireann Expressway services (usually one or two journeys a day each way) linking Baltinglass to Dublin, New Ross, Waterford and Rosslare Europort, while Thursdays-only route 132 provides a link to and from Carnew.

In November 2022, Dublin Bus met with the Social Democrats TD Jennifer Whitmore and agreed to investigate potentially extending the number 65 bus route to Baltinglass.

People
 Nikki Hayes, radio presenter and DJ.
 John Thomond O'Brien, 19th century military officer and adventurer in South America.
 Kevin O'Brien, inter-county GAA player.
 Larry Murphy, rapist and suspected serial killer.
 Billy Timmins, Fine Gael TD.

See also
 Baltinglass (Parliament of Ireland constituency)

References

Notes

Citations

Towns and villages in County Wicklow